Howard Maxwell Day (10 August 1917 – 9 March 1998) was an  Australian rules footballer who played with Hawthorn in the Victorian Football League (VFL).

Day later served in the Australian Army during World War II.

Notes

External links 

1917 births
1998 deaths
Australian rules footballers from Victoria (Australia)
Hawthorn Football Club players
Collegians Football Club players